Sergio Aliaga Chivite (born ) is a Spanish male track cyclist. He competed in the team sprint event at the 2015 UCI Track Cycling World Championships.

References

External links
 Profile at cyclingarchives.com

1991 births
Living people
Spanish track cyclists
Spanish male cyclists
People from Tudela (comarca)
Cyclists from Navarre